The 5th Canadian Infantry Brigade was an infantry brigade of the Canadian Army that fought during World War I and World War II. Raised in 1915, it formed part of the 2nd Canadian Division and fought on the Western Front during World War I before being disbanded. Later, it was re-raised in September 1939 and subsequently took part in Allied operations in north-west Europe in 1944 and 1945.

History

World War I
Formed in early 1915, the 5th Brigade formed part of the 2nd Canadian Division that was raised as part of the Canadian Expeditionary Force. Departing Canada in May 1915, further training was conducted in the United Kingdom around Shorncliffe before the brigade was committed to the Western Front in September 1915. The brigade's first major actions commenced early the following year around St Eloi, after which the brigade participated in many significant actions for the next two-and-a-half years that it was deployed along the Western Front.

World War II
Mobilized on 1 September 1939 as part of the 2nd Canadian Infantry Division, the brigade was formed before the declaration of World War II, and the battalions were promptly fleshed out by volunteers. Further expansion of the brigade was hindered by a temporary halt in recruitment and uncertainty about overseas deployment. Consequently, brigade headquarters were not actually formed until May – June 1940.
 
After the Dieppe Raid the brigade, with the 2nd Canadian Division, moved to Normandy in time to serve with the British Second Army. They participated in the advance along the Channel Coast with the First Canadian Army, including the liberation of Dieppe. The division saw heavy action in the Netherlands in late 1944, and took part in the final offensives in 1945.

Units

World War I
During World War I, the brigade consisted of four infantry battalions, as follows:
22nd (Canadien Francais) Battalion Canadian Infantry: 21 October 1914 – 11 November 1918;
24th (Victoria Rifles) Battalion Canadian Infantry: 22 October 1914 – 11 November 1918;
25th (Nova Scotia) Battalion Canadian Infantry: 28 October 1914 – 11 November 1918;
26th (New Brunswick) Battalion Canadian Infantry: 2 November 1914 – 11 November 1918.

In addition, the brigade was supported by a machine gun company and trench mortar battalion.

World War II
In 1939, the second division was organized along regional lines, like the 1st Canadian Infantry Division.  The 5th Infantry Brigade's order of battle upon formation in Quebec was as follows:

1st Battalion, The Black Watch (Royal Highland Regiment) of Canada – Montreal, Quebec
1st Battalion, Les Fusiliers Mont-Royal – Montreal, Quebec
1st Battalion, Le Régiment de Maisonneuve – Montreal, Quebec
1st Battalion, Le Régiment de la Chaudière – Levis, Quebec

By 1944–45, a ground defence platoon had been added to the brigade's order of battle. Provided by the Lorne Scots, this platoon was designated the 5th Infantry Brigade Ground Defence Platoon (Lorne Scots).

See also
Military history of Canada during World War II
Military history of Canada
Canadian Armed Forces

References

External links
CalgaryHighlanders.com
canadiansoldiers.com

Infantry brigades of the Canadian Army
Canadian World War II brigades
Canadian World War I brigades
Military units and formations established in 1915
Military units and formations disestablished in the 1940s